Ꞧ (lowercase ꞧ) is a letter derived from the Latin alphabet letter R, combined with bar diacritic. It was used in Latvian orthography before 1921.

The forms are represented in Unicode as:

See also 
 Unified Northern Alphabet

References

Latin-script letters
Latvian language